DXWR (96.3 FM), broadcasting as 96.3 iFM Music and News, is a radio station owned and operated by Radio Mindanao Network. The station's studio and transmitter are located at the 2nd Floor, Zameveco Bldg., Pilar St., Zamboanga City.

History
DXWR was established in 1978 on 93.9 FM with a Top 40 format. In 1986, it transferred its frequency to 96.3 FM. On August 16, 1992, the station was relaunched as Smile Radio 96.3 with a mass-based format. On November 23, 1999, it rebranded as 963 WRFM and returned to its Top 40 format with the slogan, "Live It Up!". On May 16, 2002, the station rebranded as 96.3 iFM and brought back its mass-based format. On June 25, 2018, the station added news and talk to its format, with news provided by its AM sister station DXRZ.

References

External links
iFM Zamboanga FB Page
iFM Zamboanga Website

News and talk radio stations in the Philippines
Radio stations established in 1978
Radio stations in Zamboanga City